The 2007 Borno State gubernatorial election was the 6th gubernatorial election of Borno State. Held on April 14, 2011, the All Nigeria Peoples Party nominee Ali Modu Sheriff won the election, defeating Kashim Ibrahim-Imam of the People's Democratic Party.

Results 
A total of 11 candidates contested in the election. Ali Modu Sheriff from the All Nigeria Peoples Party won the election, defeating Kashim Ibrahim-Imam from the People's Democratic Party. Registered voters was 2,159,515.

References 

Borno State gubernatorial elections
Borno gubernatorial